Florea Voinea (born 21 April 1941) is a Romanian retired footballer who played as a striker.

Club career
Florea Voinea was born on 21 April 1941 in Puchenii Moșneni, Prahova County and started to play football at junior level at Rafinăria 1 Ploiești and Petrolul Ploiești. He started to play at senior level in Divizia B at Prahova Ploiești, after two seasons he returned to Petrolul, where he made his Divizia A debut on 20 August 1961 in a 6–2 away victory against CCA București in which he scored a goal. He went to play for Steaua București where he won the 1967–68 Divizia A, being the team's top-goalscorer with 13 goals scored in 25 matches and he also won five Cupa României, scoring in all the finals, in the last two scoring a double in each. After a period of two years spent in France at Nîmes Olympique, Voinea came back in Romania, having a second spell at Steaua București, afterwards spending a season at CSM Reșița and one at Politehnica Timișoara where he made his last Divizia A appearance on 25 May 1975 in a 2–2 against Steagul Roșu Brașov, retiring after playing one season in Divizia B at UM Timișoara. Florea Voinea played 251 Divizia A matches in which he scored 117 goals, appeared in a total of 16 matches in which he scored 2 goals in European competitions, scored 13 goals in all competitions for Steaua in the derby against Dinamo, being the team's all-time top-goalscorer of the derby and scored a total of 40 goals in Cupa României.

Transfer at Nîmes Olympique
During Romania's communist era, transfers of Romanian footballers outside the country were rarely allowed, but in June 1970 dictator Nicolae Ceaușescu went on a visit in Nîmes where he was invited by the communist mayor of the town Georges Pompidou. At that meeting they also talked about football and Pompidou complained about the poor results of the local football team, Nîmes Olympique so Ceaușescu told him that he was going to send two Romanian footballers to the club. Some French people were sent to see the 1970 Cupa României final which was won with 2–1 by Steaua București against Dinamo București, both of Steaua București's goals being scored by Voinea, and they selected Voinea from Steaua and Ion Pârcălab from Dinamo to come and play for Nîmes Olympique, where in the 1971–72 season they helped the team finish second in the championship, each of them scoring 11 goals.

International career
Florea Voinea played one friendly game at international level for Romania, appearing on 29 October 1967 under coach Constantin Teașcă in a 0–0 against Poland. He also played for Romania's Olympic team in a 2–1 victory against Denmark at the 1964 Summer Olympics qualifiers.

Honours
Steaua București
Divizia A: 1967–68
Cupa României: 1961–62, 1965–66, 1966–67, 1968–69, 1969–70
Nîmes
French Division 1 runner-up: 1971–72
Romania
UEFA European Under-18 Championship: 1962

Notes

References

External links

1937 births
Living people
People from Prahova County
Association football forwards
Romanian footballers
Olympic footballers of Romania
Romania international footballers
FC Petrolul Ploiești players
FC Steaua București players
CSM Reșița players
Nîmes Olympique players
FC Politehnica Timișoara players
Romanian expatriate footballers
Expatriate footballers in France
Romanian expatriate sportspeople in France
Liga I players
Liga II players
Ligue 1 players